Sudarshana Denipitiya is a  Sri Lankan politician and a member of the Sri Lankan parliament from Badulla Electoral District as a member of the Sri Lanka Podujana Peramuna.

References

Sri Lanka Podujana Peramuna politicians
Living people
Members of the 16th Parliament of Sri Lanka
Year of birth missing (living people)